Rich Square is a town in Northampton County, North Carolina, United States. The population was 958 at the 2010 census. It is part of the Roanoke Rapids, North Carolina Micropolitan Statistical Area.

History
Rich Square was first incorporated in 1869 and is the oldest town in Northampton County. The town takes its name from the earliest recorded land purchase of 640 acres on March 9, 1717, which comprised a square mile of fertile farmland inside the current city limits. Two locations in or near the town, Duke-Lawrence House and Edgewood, also known as Holoman-Outland House are listed on the National Register of Historic Places.

Geography
Rich Square is located at  (36.273267, -77.284132).

According to the United States Census Bureau, the town has a total area of 2.8 square miles (7.3 km), all  land.

Demographics

2020 census

As of the 2020 United States census, there were 894 people, 359 households, and 180 families residing in the town.

2000 census
As of the census of 2000, there were 931 people, 395 households, and 259 families residing in the town. The population density was 330.6 people per square mile (127.5/km). There were 441 housing units at an average density of 156.6 per square mile (60.4/km). The racial makeup of the town was 42.75% White, 55.85% African American, 0.32% Native American, 0.54% from other races, and 0.54% from two or more races. Hispanic or Latino of any race were 1.07% of the population.

There were 395 households, out of which 24.8% had children under the age of 18 living with them, 45.1% were married couples living together, 16.7% had a female householder with no husband present, and 34.2% were non-families. 31.4% of all households were made up of individuals, and 16.2% had someone living alone who was 65 years of age or older. The average household size was 2.36 and the average family size was 2.95.

In the town, the population was spread out, with 22.4% under the age of 18, 5.9% from 18 to 24, 24.8% from 25 to 44, 26.3% from 45 to 64, and 20.5% who were 65 years of age or older. The median age was 43 years. For every 100 females, there were 79.4 males. For every 100 females age 18 and over, there were 71.5 males.

The median income for a household in the town was $22,656, and the median income for a family was $30,000. Males had a median income of $27,083 versus $19,135 for females. The per capita income for the town was $13,079. About 15.5% of families and 19.0% of the population were below the poverty line, including 21.3% of those under age 18 and 22.2% of those age 65 or over.

Notable people
 
 Wesley Tann (1928-2012) - fashion designer

Rich Square in the news
 Eric Talmadge. "Deserter Adjusting to Life on Japan Island". Associated Press. January 31, 2005.
 Richard Pyle. "World War II P-38 fighter discovered in Wales." Associated Press. November 14, 2007.

References

Towns in Northampton County, North Carolina
Roanoke Rapids, North Carolina micropolitan area
Towns in North Carolina